Environment Secretary can refer to:
 Cabinet Secretary for Rural Affairs and the Environment, Scotland
 Secretary for the Environment, Transport and Works, Hong Kong
 Secretary of State for Environment, Food and Rural Affairs, United Kingdom
 Secretary of the Environment (Mexico)

See also

 Environment Directorate (disambiguation)
 Environment minister
 List of environmental ministries
 List of ministers of the environment